Sondra Erickson (born March 2, 1942) is a Minnesota politician and member of the Minnesota House of Representatives. A member of the Republican Party of Minnesota, she represents District 15A, which includes portions of Kanabec, Mille Lacs, and Sherburne counties in the west central part of the state. She is also a retired English teacher at Princeton High School in Princeton.

Early education and career
Erickson graduated from Concordia College in Moorhead, receiving her B.S. in English. She later attended graduate school at the University of St. Thomas in Saint Paul. In addition to her career as an educator, she served on the Minnesota Board of Teaching from 1992–1997, and on the Minnesota Statehood Sesquicentennial Commission from 2006-2008.

Minnesota House of Representatives
Erickson was first elected to the House in a 1998 special election, held after Rep. LeRoy Koppendrayer resigned to accept an appointment to the Minnesota Public Utilities Commission by Minnesota Governor Arne Carlson. She was re-elected in 2000, 2002, 2004 and 2006. Prior to the 2002 legislative redistricting, she represented the old District 17A. She was unseated by Gail Kulick Jackson in the 2008 election, losing by just 89 votes after a recount. In 2010, she ran again, unseating Jackson with 55.38% to 44.39% of the vote.

She served as chair of the Ethics Committee from 2003-2007 and from 2015-2018.

References

External links

 Rep. Erickson Web Page
 Minnesota Public Radio Votetracker: Rep. Sondra Erickson Profile
 Project Votesmart - Rep. Sondra Erickson Profile
 Sondra Erickson Campaign Web Site

1942 births
Living people
People from Princeton, Minnesota
Republican Party members of the Minnesota House of Representatives
Women state legislators in Minnesota
Concordia College (Moorhead, Minnesota) alumni
University of St. Thomas (Minnesota) alumni
21st-century American politicians
21st-century American women politicians
Schoolteachers from Minnesota
American women educators